The Enchantment is a 2007 album released on the Concord label by pianist Chick Corea and banjoist Béla Fleck.

The album was released to favorable reviews and went on to win the Latin Grammy Award for Best Instrumental Album at the 8th Annual Latin Grammy Awards. Fleck was also nominated that year for a Grammy Award for the song "Spectacle" in the Best Instrumental Composition category. The album peaked at number six on the Billboard Top Jazz albums chart.

Track listing 
All tracks written by either Chick Corea or Béla Fleck, except where noted.
 "Señorita" (Chick Corea) – 5:20
 "Spectacle" (Bela Fleck) – 4:40
 "Joban Dna Nopia" (Corea) – 6:28
 "Mountain" (Fleck) – 3:53
 "Children’s Song #6" (Corea) – 4:02
 "A Strange Romance"  (Fleck) – 4:46
 "Menagerie" (Fleck) – 5:53
 "Waltse for Abby" (Fleck)– 3:02
 "Brazil" (Ary Barroso, Sidney Russell) – 5:58
 "The Enchantment" (Corea) – 5:39
 "Sunset Road" (Fleck) – 4:36

Personnel

Musicians
 Chick Corea – piano
 Béla Fleck – banjo

Production
 Bernard Alexander – Piano Tuner
 Brian Alexander – Piano Technician
 Marc Bessant – Design
 Jay Blakesberg – Photography
 Evelyn Brechtlein – Project Coordinator
 Sarah Jane Coleman – Lettering
 C. Taylor Crothers – Photography
 Bernie Grundman – Mastering
 Bernie Kirsh – Engineer, Mixing
 Julie Rooney – Graphic Consultant
 Buck Snow – Assistant Engineer

Charts

References 

Chick Corea albums
2007 albums
Concord Records albums
Collaborative albums
Béla Fleck albums